The 1980 Arizona Wildcats football team represented the University of Arizona in the Pacific-10 Conference (Pac-10) during the 1980 NCAA Division I-A football season.  In their first season under head coach Larry Smith, the Wildcats compiled a 5–6 record (3–4 against Pac-10 opponents), finished in a tie for sixth place in the Pac-10, and were outscored by their opponents, 275 to 215.  The team played its home games in Arizona Stadium in Tucson, Arizona.

Despite finishing the season with a 5–6 record, the Wildcats defeated UCLA (who was ranked second at the time), which was a memorable moment in the early part of Smith's tenure at Arizona.

The team's statistical leaders included Tom Tunnicliffe with 1,204 passing yards, Hubert Oliver with 655 rushing yards, and Tim Holmes with 545 receiving yards. Linebacker Jack Housley led the team with 104 total tackles.

Before the season
Arizona finished the 1979 season with a 6–5 record, and lost to Pittsburgh in the Fiesta Bowl. During the offseason, head coach Tony Mason was discovered as being allegedly involved in a cash payment scandal by giving boosters money to players, which was illegal under NCAA rules. As a result, Mason resigned as coach and was replaced by Smith, who was coaching at Tulane. Smith was a former assistant coach at Arizona under Mason's predecessor Jim Young. In a press conference, Smith promised to rebuild the program and bring the team to a winning success.

Schedule

Personnel

Game summaries

Colorado State
Arizona opened the season against ex-WAC foe Colorado State in Smith's debut as Wildcat coach. The Rams converted on a field goal on the last play of the game to win it.

California
The Wildcats went on the road to Berkeley to face California. Arizona narrowly defeated the Golden Bears to give Smith not only his first win as Arizona coach, but his first Pac-10 victory as well as his first road win.

Iowa

The Wildcats traveled to Iowa in their next game against the Hawkeyes. Both Arizona and Iowa's offenses struggled throughout the game, but the Wildcats’ defense dominated and scored a safety early by blocking a punt. Arizona ultimately held on for the victory. It was one of the only games in college football history in which a team won by only scoring exactly five points. It was also Arizona's fifth consecutive win over Iowa dating back to 1970. They would not defeat the Hawkeyes again until 1998.

USC

In Smith's first big test as Arizona's coach, the Wildcats took on USC, who was ranked second in the nation. The Trojans would hold the Wildcats to only ten points to win. Smith would become a future coach at USC in 1987.

Notre Dame

Arizona played Notre Dame for the first time since 1941. At home against the fourth-ranked Fighting Irish, the Wildcats never had a chance against the Fighting Irish, and scored only a field goal.

To date, this remains Notre Dame's only visit to Tucson, as the Wildcats believed that it would be too expensive to schedule a home game against a storied non-conference opponent like the Irish, allegedly since Tucson is a smaller market.

UCLA

For homecoming, Arizona hosted second-ranked UCLA. The Bruins were poised to get the top ranking with a win, as Alabama lost to Mississippi State earlier that day. However, the Wildcats put those hopes to rest by upsetting the Bruins and finally giving Smith his first home win as coach. It was also Smith's first big win at Arizona. The win by Arizona, combined with Alabama's loss, stunned the college football world as the top two ranked teams lost that day.

Arizona State

    
    
    
    
    
    
    
    

In the rivalry game, Arizona and Arizona State faced each other. For the Wildcats, this was Smith's first matchup against ASU. The more experienced Sun Devils dominated the mistake-prone Wildcats in a blowout. Arizona managed to get on the scoreboard with a touchdown in the third quarter that prevented a shutout.

The Wildcats finished Smith's first season with a record of 5–6.

Season notes
 Smith's first season was known as a rebuilding year to fans. An extremely difficult schedule also affected Arizona's chances at a bowl game, and led to the team's mediocre record.
 The season was the only one in the 1980s that Arizona finished with a losing record and one of only two seasons in the decade that they had a non-winning record (the other was in 1987 when they went 4–4–3).
 Also, this season started a decade of resurgence for the Wildcats, fulfilling Smith's promise when he was hired before the season started (see above).
 Arizona did not play Texas Tech for the first time since 1970.
 The victory over UCLA was the first big win under Smith, which became overshadowed by Arizona's upset of USC (UCLA's chief rival) during the following season.
 This season was the only one in Smith lost to ASU at home. Arizona did not lose to their rival at home again until 1992.
 This was the last season until 2012 that Arizona wore red helmets and also the last season until 2005 that they wore red jerseys. The Wildcats’ red jerseys had been their primary home jerseys since 1977 and wore blue jerseys on a secondary basis at the time. In this season, Arizona only wore blue against Washington State and Pacific. Beginning in 1981, the blue jerseys became the full-time home jerseys and Arizona returned to wearing white helmets for the first time since 1976. The helmets featured a red “A” on them and it was worn by players until the end of the 1989 season.

References

Arizona
Arizona Wildcats football seasons
Arizona Wildcats football